Samuel Emery may refer to:

 Samuel Anderson Emery (1814–1881), English stage actor
 Samuel Horouta Emery (1885–1967), New Zealand labourer, rugby player and businessman